This article is about the 2006 season of the Wigan Warriors in the Super League and Challenge Cup.

Statistics 

Tries

Goals

Points

Appearances

2006 squad

Key players 
Key players for Wigan Warriors in 2006 were:

 Chris Ashton was brought in to the Wigan squad at the start of 2006 as replacement for the injured Kris Radlinski. Ashton had impressed on his debut for Wigan in 2005, scoring two tries against Huddersfield Giants but in 2006 he showed good skill, pace and talent and impressed many Wigan fans and people within rugby league. He finished the 2006 season as the leading try scorer at Wigan and his support play throughout the season was excellent. Although some criticism was made about his defensive abilities, he did earn a call into the England squad at the end of the year. Ashton was one of the most consistent players for Wigan through the 2006 and was a contender for the Young Player of the Year award.
 Michael Dobson was signed by Wigan after his loan finished with Catalans Dragons as a replacement for Denis Moran, who had been released by Wigan a week earlier. Dobson had impressed for Catalans Dragons, but when he signed for Wigan, they were at the bottom of the league and facing relegation at the end of the season. His talents, organisation skills and goal kicking were a big factor in Wigan surviving relegation. In 2006 Michael Dobson was the most consistent goal kicker in Rugby League.
 Stuart Fielden signed for Wigan from Bradford Bulls on 22 June 2006 for a Super League record transfer fee of £450,000. Fielden was regarded as one of the best props in the world by many, and his influence in the Wigan team could clearly be seen. He was strong in both attack and defence and offered leadership and inspiration to the rest of the Wigan players. Fielden was one of the main reasons that Wigan avoided relegation in 2006; not only did he provide a physical presence on the pitch, he offered new hope to Wigan fans and players.

Transfers 
2006 Transfer (In)

2006 Transfer (Out)

2006 Loans (In)

2006 Loans (Out)

Staff 
 Chief executive – Carol Banks
 Chief administrator – Mary Sharkey
 Head coach – Brian Noble
 Head coach – Ian Millward (sacked April 2006)
 Chairman – Maurice P. Lindsay

References

External links
 Wigan RL 2006 Season on the Wigan RL Fansite.
 Wigan RL 2006 Senior Academy Team on the Wigan RL Fansite.
 Wigan RL 2006 Junior Academy Team on the Wigan RL Fansite.
 Official site
 Wigan-Warriors fan site

Wigan Warriors seasons
Wigan Warriors season